The Edythe C. and Stanley L. Harrison Opera House, also known as the Harrison Opera House, is the official home of the Virginia Opera in the Neon District of Downtown Norfolk on the border of the Ghent Square neighborhood.

Built as a public works auditorium, this theatre served as a venue for World War II USO shows. The theater was known previously as Norfolk Center Theater. The venue was renovated by architecture firm, GUND Partnership, reopening in 1993 as a dedicated opera facility with a 1,632 seating capacity. The building originally contained both the  USO/Center Theater along with the adjoining former Norfolk Municipal Auditorium, which now serves as storage and administrative space for the Virginia Opera. 

The opera house is named after Stanley and Edythe Harrison, a former member of the Virginia House of Delegates and founding president of the Virginia Opera.

External links
 City of Norfolk's Seven Venues official site
 Harrison Opera House:  Virginia Opera's official site

References

Opera houses in Virginia
Music venues in Virginia
Buildings and structures in Norfolk, Virginia
Culture of Norfolk, Virginia
Tourist attractions in Norfolk, Virginia
Theatres in Virginia
Downtown Norfolk, Virginia